The Annunciation Church of the Alexander Nevsky Lavra is a historic  church in the centre of Saint Petersburg. It is part of the monastic complex of the Alexander Nevsky Lavra and contains a large number of burials dating back to the founding of the city, as well as monuments and memorials to notable figures that were brought to the church from other locations during the Soviet period.

Design and construction
Construction of the church, designed by Domenico Trezzini, began in 1717. It was initially planned that the ground floor would house the monastery's refectory, but this was altered to instead create a burial space for members of the royal family and prominent dignitaries. As completed the building contained two churches. The upper, dedicated to Saint Alexander Nevsky and used to hold his relics on their arrival into the city, was consecrated in 1724. The lower, dedicated to the Annunciation of the Virgin Mary, was consecrated in 1725. Underneath the building was a burial vault constructed in 1720.

Imperial burials

The first interment was that of Tsarina Praskovia Saltykova, the wife of Tsar Ivan V, on 24 October 1723. On Peter's orders the remains of his sister, Natalya Alexeyevna, and his infant son Peter Petrovich, who had originally been buried in the monastery's Lazarevsky Church, were transferred to the burial vault. Several other members of the imperial family were later buried in the church, including those who had lost their positions through palace coups. Among them were Anna Leopoldovna, mother of Tsar Ivan VI and regent during her son's brief reign; and Emperor Peter III who was deposed and killed in a palace coup that brought his wife to the throne as Empress Catherine II. Peter III was quietly interred in the church in July 1762, thus denying him burial in the traditional resting place of the post-Peter the Great rulers, the Saints Peter and Paul Cathedral. Peter III's remains were later removed from the church and reburied in the Saints Peter and Paul Cathedral on the orders of his son when he ascended to the throne as Paul I. Other members of the imperial family buried in the church include Catherine Ivanovna, Peter the Great's niece; Natalia Alexeievna, Paul I's first wife; and several children who died in infancy, including two daughters of Emperor Alexander I and Elizabeth Alexeievna; Olga Pavlovna, daughter of Emperor Paul I and Maria Feodorovna.

Those with close connections to the imperial court were also buried here. Among them were courtiers Yevdokiya Yusupova, Anastasiya Trubetskaya, and Anna Matyushkina; as well as Alexei Razumovsky, lover and rumoured husband of Empress Elizabeth; and Maria Rumyantseva, mistress of Peter the Great. Members of several important noble families were also buried here, including the Shuvalovs, Betskoys, Vyazemskys, Naryshkins, and Yusupovs. On 12 May 1800 the hero of the French Revolutionary Wars Generalissimo Alexander Suvorov was buried in the church, under a white marble slab with the simple inscription, chosen by the Generalissimo himself, "Here lies Suvorov". An extension along the south-eastern part of the church was built in 1783, which came to house the family monuments of several noble houses, including the Shuvalovs, Betskoys, Vyazemskys and Naryshkins. A small sacristy was attached to the eastern side of the church, which later housed the Yusupov family's monuments. In the 1860s the Yakunchikov family had a small crypt built in the church's north-western corner, and in 1871 P. D. Sokhansky built a marble tomb for the Bobrinsky family under the staircase annex.

Soviet museum

Closed in 1933, the church was divided between office space and the forerunner of the  during the early Soviet period. During this period, some of the funerary monuments from the Lavra's Nikolo-Fyodorovskaya and Isidorovskaya churches, which had been closed in 1931, were moved to the lower Annunciation Church. In 1940, the entire building was transferred to the State Museum of Urban Sculpture. The memorials of Napoleonic military leaders Mikhail Miloradovich and Dmitry Senyavin were placed in the church after the closure of the Dukhovskaya Church, while those of Ivan Lazarev and Gerasim Lebedev were brought from other locations as part of a general clearing of cemeteries and the concentration of funerary monuments into centralised museum necropolises. In other instances parts of memorials, such as plaques and reliefs from the monuments of Alexei Turchaninov and Anna Vorontsova in the Lavra's Lazarevskoe Cemetery were installed in the church. In the case of sculptor Mikhail Kozlovsky, his monument was transferred from the Smolensky Cemetery to the Lazarevskoe in 1931, with some of the reliefs installed in the Annunciation Church.

On 15 May 1950, the building opened as a museum display of historic funerary monuments under the auspices of the State Museum of Urban Sculpture. On 7 April 2013, the 300th anniversary of the monastery, it was announced that the Annunciation Church would be returned to the Alexander Nevsky Lavra.  The return of the church to the monastery authorities has however been complicated by questions around the ownership of the memorials.

Originally buried in the church

House of Romanov

Georgian royalty

Orthodox clergy

Nobility

Memorials transferred from other sites during the Soviet period

References

Monuments and memorials in Saint Petersburg